Glasse is a surname. Notable people with the surname include:

 Fred Glasse (1889–1977), New Zealand engineer and local politician
 George Glasse (1761–1809), English chaplain and Fellow of the Royal Society
 Hannah Glasse (1708–1770), English cookery writer

See also
 Glass (surname)
 Glass, archaically spelled "glasse"